César Hernández may refer to:

 César Hernández (infielder) (born 1990), Venezuelan baseball second basemen
 César Hernández (outfielder) (born 1966), Dominican Republic baseball outfielder
 César Hernández Alfonzo (born 1977), Puerto Rican politician